Bansa Gopal Chowdhury  is an Indian politician and was the member of Parliament of the 15th Lok Sabha of India who represents the Asansol constituency of West Bengal and is a member of the Communist Party of India (Marxist) political party.

Early life and education
Bansa Chowdhury was born in Raniganj, West Bengal. He did his graduation from Triveni Devi Bhalotia College in Raniganj. Chowdhury was a social worker prior to becoming a politician.

Political career

Bansa Chowdhury, prior to contesting for Lok Sabha elections, was also a member of the West Bengal Legislative Assembly and was also a Cabinet Minister in the West Bengal government. Chowdhury was also an elected parliamentarian from the same constituency in the 14th Lok Sabha of India. He is currently a member of CPI(M) West Bengal State Committee and the Secretary of CITU Paschim Bardhaman District Committee.

Posts held

See also
 
14th Lok Sabha
15th Lok Sabha
Politics of India
Parliament of India
Government of India
Asansol (Lok Sabha constituency)
Communist Party of India (Marxist)

References 

India MPs 2004–2009
India MPs 2009–2014
1960 births
Communist Party of India (Marxist) politicians from West Bengal
Lok Sabha members from West Bengal
People from Paschim Bardhaman district
Living people
Communist Party of India (Marxist) candidates in the 2014 Indian general election
People from Asansol
Indian communists
Indian socialists